SLQ may refer to

 SkyLink Express, a Canadian cargo airline, by ICAO code
 Sleetmute Airport, Alaska, by IATA code
 St. Lawrence and Atlantic Railroad, Canada, by reporting mark
 St Leonards Warrior Square railway station, a railway station in Sussex, England
 State Library of Queensland, Australia
 Standing Liberty quarter, a 25-cent coin that was struck by the United States Mint from 1916 to 1930

slq is the ISO 639 code of the Salchuq language.